Several ships of the Royal Navy have been named HMS Onslaught:

 , an  launched in 1915 and sold for scrap in 1921.
 , an O-class destroyer launched in 1941. In 1951 she was sold to Pakistan and renamed Tughril. She was scrapped in 1977.

Royal Navy ship names